Parapsychology is a field of research that studies a number of ostensible paranormal phenomena, including telepathy, precognition, clairvoyance, psychokinesis, near-death experiences, reincarnation, and apparitional experiences.

Essence of parapsychology 

 Fringe science
 Paranormal
 Pseudoscience
 Psionics
 Psychic
 Psychology

General concepts 
 Abacomancy
 Altered state of consciousness
 Apparitional experience
 Astral body
 Aura (paranormal)
 Clairaudience
 Clairsentience
 Clairvoyance
 Cold reading
 Dowsing
 Ectoplasm (paranormal)
 Exorcist
 Extrasensory perception (ESP)
 Ganzfeld experiment
 Ghosts
 Global Consciousness Project
 Haunted house
 History of parapsychology
 Hot reading
 Hypnosis
 IANDS
 Journal of Parapsychology
 List of psychic abilities
 Materialization (parapsychology)
 Medical intuitive
 Mediumship
 Mental Radio
 Metaphysical levitation
 Mind–body interventions
 Morphic field
 National Laboratory of Psychical Research
 Near-death experience
 Near-death studies
 Out-of-body experiences
 Paranormal
 Parapsychological Association
 Parapsychology
 Past life regression
 Pauli effect
 Poltergeist
 Precognition
 Prescience
 Project Alpha
 Psychic
 Psychic reading
 Psychokinesis
 Psychometry
 Pyrokinesis
 Radiesthesia
 Reincarnation research
 Remote viewing
 Research results in parapsychology
 Retrocognition
 Rhine Research Center
 Stargate Project
 Synchronicity
 Telepathy
 Therapeutic touch
 Transliminality
 Transpersonal experience
 Unexplained Mysteries
 Veridical dream
 Zener card

Organizations
 American Society for Psychical Research
 International Association for Near-Death Studies
 National Laboratory of Psychical Research
 Parapsychological Association
 Princeton Engineering Anomalies Research Lab
 Society for Psychical Research

Parapsychologists 

 Óscar González-Quevedo
 Loyd Auerbach
 Daryl Bem
 Hans Bender
 Stephen E. Braude
 Whately Carington
 Hereward Carrington
 Michael Daniels
 Théodore Flournoy
 Nandor Fodor
 Bruce Greyson
 László Harasztosi
 Hans Holzer
 Charles Honorton
 Thomson Jay Hudson
 James H. Hyslop
 Alexander Imich
 Lawrence LeShan
 Rufus Osgood Mason
 James Hewat McKenzie
 Michel Moine
 Thelma Moss
 Gardner Murphy
 Ciarán O'Keeffe
 Frank Podmore
 Joseph Gaither Pratt
 Harold E. Puthoff
 Dean Radin
 Konstantīns Raudive
 Carl Reichenbach
 Joseph Banks Rhine
 Kenneth Ring
 D. Scott Rogo
 William G. Roll
 Henry Sidgwick
 Ian Stevenson
 Charles Tart
 Rudolf Tischner
 Jim B. Tucker
 René Warcollier

Publications
 Extrasensory Perception
 Irreducible Mind: Toward a Psychology for the 21st Century
 Journal of Consciousness Studies
 Journal of Near-Death Studies
 Journal of Parapsychology
 Journal of Scientific Exploration
 Life After Life: The Investigation of a Phenomenon—Survival of Bodily Death
 Life Before Life: A Scientific Investigation of Children's Memories of Previous Lives
 Old Souls: The Scientific Evidence For Past Lives
 Parapsychology: Frontier Science of the Mind
 The Roots of Coincidence
 Twenty Cases Suggestive of Reincarnation

See also 
 List of paranormal subjects
 Paranormal
 Psychology

External links 

 Parapsychology FAQ Frequently asked questions, by the Parapsychological Association, one of the major groups studying parapsychological phenomena.
 FindArticles.com Index Large number of articles about parapsychology, from publications such as the Journal of Parapsychology and the Skeptical Inquirer.
 Committee for Skeptical Inquiry Organization formed in 1976 to encourage the critical investigation of paranormal claims and parapsychology.

Parapsychology
Parapsychology
 Outline